Île-de-France tramway Line 8 (usually called simply T8, also known as Tram'y in project phase) is part of the modern tram network of the Île-de-France region of France. Line T8 connects Saint-Denis – Porte de Paris Paris Métro station in Saint-Denis and two branches terminating at Villetaneuse-Université station and Épinay-Orgemont, in the Northern suburbs of Paris. It opened to the public on 16 December 2014.  

Line T8 is operated by the Régie autonome des transports parisiens (RATP) under the authority of Île-de-France Mobilités.

Route

Notes and references 

Tram lines in Île-de-France
Ile-de-France tramway Line 8
Standard gauge railways in France